The IfM – Small and Medium Sized Companies and Entrepreneurship (in German: Institut für Mittelstandsforschung) in Mannheim, Germany is an economic and entrepreneurship research institute and associated with the University of Mannheim. Under the leadership of Prof. Dr. Michael Woywode, president of the Institute, IfM employs a staff of about 30 researchers. The IfM was established in Mannheim in 1987 and is still headquartered there. The institute is organized as an NGO with a legal form of  gGmbH.

Organization and Research 
The IfM Mannheim has defined four core research areas:
 Management Concepts and Information/Communication Technology
 Family businesses
 Contemporary Self-Responsibility
 Entrepreneurship

See also
 Mannheim
 University of Mannheim

Notes and references

External links
 University of Mannheim
 Universität Mannheim (German webpage)
 Mannheim Graduate School of Economics and Social Sciences
 Mannheim Business School

University of Mannheim
Research institutes in Germany